Treptower Park (with a silent w) is a park alongside the river Spree in Alt-Treptow, in the district of Treptow-Köpenick, south of central Berlin.

History 

It was the location of the Great Industrial Exposition of Berlin in 1896. It is a popular place for recreation of Berliners and a tourist attraction. On 14 July 1987 it was used by British band Barclay James Harvest for the first ever open-air concert by a western rock band in the German Democratic Republic.

Soviet war memorial 

Its prominent feature is the Soviet War Memorial (sometimes translated as the "Soviet Cenotaph"), built to the design of the Soviet architect Yakov Belopolsky to commemorate the 80,000 Soviet soldiers who fell in the Battle of Berlin in April–May 1945. It was opened four years after the war ended, on May 8, 1949.

See also
 Klingende Blume

References

External links 
 
 Website der Bürgerinitiative Treptower Park
 Rollercoaster Database - Spree-Park Info

Parks in Berlin
Treptow-Köpenick
Urban public parks
World's fair sites in Germany